WOW FM could refer to:
5WOW , a community radio station licensed as Way Out West Broadcasters transmitting on 100.5 MHz in Semaphore, South Australia 
2WOW, a radio station branded as "WOW FM" (100.7 FM) licensed to Penrith, New South Wales, Australia
Wow FM 103.5, a radio station (DXRV-FM, 103.5 FM) licensed to Davao City, Philippines
WOW FM 100.5, a radio station branded as "WOW FM" broadcasting to the western suburbs of Adelaide, South Australia
DWKY, a radio station branded as "91.5 Energy FM" licensed to Pasig, Philippines
KWQW, a radio station branded as "WOW-FM" (98.3 FM) licensed to Boone, Iowa, United States
WOWF, a radio station branded as "WOW Country 102.5 FM" (102.5 FM) licensed to Crossville, Tennessee, United States
WYCD, a radio station branded as "99-5 WOW-FM" from 1992 to 1993 licensed to Detroit, Michigan, United States